Faithfull may refer to:

People
Emily Faithfull, founder of The Victoria Press
Lilian Faithfull CBE (1865-1952), an English teacher, headmistress, women's rights advocate, magistrate, social worker and humanitarian
Lucy Faithfull, Baroness Faithfull, a British social worker
Marianne Faithfull, British singer and actress
Valentine Faithfull (1820–1894), British clergyman and cricketer

Other
Faithfull Majesty (Rex Fidelissimus), a sobriquet attached to the Portuguese monarchy
Faithfull, a song by Pearl Jam

See also 
 Faithful (disambiguation)

English-language surnames